Marino Ghetaldi (2 October 1568 – 11 April 1626) was a Ragusan scientist. A mathematician and physicist who studied in Italy, England and Belgium, his best results are mainly in physics, especially optics, and mathematics. He was one of the few students of François Viète and friend of Giovanni Camillo Glorioso.

Biography

Born into the Ghetaldi noble family, he was one of six children. He was known for the application of algebra in geometry and his research in the field of geometrical optics on which he wrote 7 works including the Promotus Archimedus (1603) and the De resolutione et compositione mathematica (1630). He also produced a leaflet with the solutions of 42 geometrical problems, in 1607 and set grounds of algebraization of geometry. His contributions to geometry had been cited by Dutch physicist Christiaan Huygens and Edmond Halley, who calculated the orbit of what is known as Halley's comet, in England.

Ghetaldi was the constructor of the parabolic mirror (66 cm in diameter), kept today at the National Maritime Museum in London. He was also a pioneer in making conic lenses.  During his sojourn in Padua he met Galileo Galilei, with whom he corresponded regularly. He was a good friend to the French mathematician François Viète. He was offered the post of professor of mathematics in Old University of Leuven in Belgium, at the time one of the most prestigious university centers in Europe.

He was also engaged in politics and was the envoy of the Republic of Ragusa in Constantinople in 1606 as well as the member of the Great and Small Council, the political bodies of the Republic. He was married to Marija Sorkočević, who died giving birth to their third daughter; they had three daughters: Anica, Franica and Marija.

Works

Legacy
Two notable localities in Dubrovnik are associated with the name of Getaldić: Bete's Cave, named after Marino's nickname, where he conducted experiments with igniting mirrors; and Pozvizd, a key strategic tower in the Ston fortification system which he was commissioned to build by the authorities of the Republic of Dubrovnik in 1604.

See also
 House of Getaldić
 List of notable Ragusans

References

Sources

Bibliography
A. Favaro, "Marino Ghetaldi," Amici e corrisponsdenti di Galileo, 3 vols. (Firenze, 1983), 2, 911-34.
H. Wieleitner, "Marino Ghetaldi und die Anfänge der Koordinatengeometrie," Bibliotheca mathematica, 3rd ser., 13, pp. 242–247.
G. Barbieri, "Marino Ghetaldi," in Pietro F. Martecchini, Galleria di Ragusei illustri, (Ragusa, 1840).

External links
 

Croatian physicists
Croatian mathematicians
People from the Republic of Ragusa
1568 births
1626 deaths
16th-century mathematicians
17th-century mathematicians
Ragusan diplomats
People from Dubrovnik